Euphorbia melanadenia is a species of Euphorbia known by the common name red-gland spurge. It is native to the deserts and mountains of Baja California and southern California and Arizona, where it grows in dry, rocky habitat. It is a perennial herb forming a small clump or mat of very slender, tangling red stems. The stems are lined with pairs of slightly woolly oval-shaped leaves 2 to 9 millimeters wide. The tiny inflorescence is a cyathium less than 2 millimeters wide. The cyathium is a bell-shaped array of white, scalloped petal-like appendages surrounding the actual flowers. Each appendage has at its base a shiny red nectar gland. At the center of the appendages is a ring of male staminate flowers around a single female flower. The female flower develops into an oval-shaped fruit which bears wrinkled white seeds.

External links
Jepson Manual Treatment
USDA Plants Profile for Chamaesyce melanadenia
Chamaesyce melanadenia — UC Photos gallery

melanadenia
Flora of California
Flora of Baja California
Flora of Arizona
Flora of the Sonoran Deserts
Flora of the California desert regions
Natural history of the California chaparral and woodlands
Natural history of the Channel Islands of California
Natural history of the Colorado Desert
Natural history of the Peninsular Ranges
Natural history of the Santa Monica Mountains
Natural history of the Transverse Ranges
Flora without expected TNC conservation status